Cuba is a town on the western border of Allegany County, New York, United States. The village of Cuba lies within its borders. The federally recognized tribe of Seneca Native Americans has a reservation on the western town line. As of the 2020 Census, the total population was 3,154.

Geography

The west town line is the border of Cattaraugus County.

The Southern Tier Expressway (Interstate 86 and New York State Route 17) pass through the town, running east-west. New York State Route 305 is a major north-south highway that intersects New York State Route 446 in the village of Cuba.

Cuba is on the main line of the Western New York & Pennsylvania Railroad, which operates the former Erie Railroad between Hornell, New York and Meadville, Pennsylvania.

Communities and locations in the town of Cuba
Black Creek – A former community in the town, now in the town of New Hudson.  Black Creek is mentioned often in the early history of the town.
Cuba – A village in the western part of the town.
Cuba Lake – A lake in the northwest corner of the town.
North Cuba – A hamlet north of Cuba village on Route 305.
Oil Springs Creek – A stream passing through the Village of Cuba.
Oil Springs Reservation – A reservation of the Seneca at the western town line.
South Cuba – A hamlet south of Cuba village on Route 305.
Seymour – A former community in the town located near North Cuba.
Summit – A location east of Cuba village on County Road 20 (Cuba-Friendship Road), also called "Cuba Summit".
Tannery Creek – A stream flowing across the town and through Cuba village.

Adjacent towns
Cuba is north of the town of Clarksville and south of the town of New Hudson. It is east of the town of Ischua in Cattaraugus County and west of the town of Friendship.

Etymology
John S. Minard's Civic History of Cuba, published in 1910, states:
"Cuba is a Roman word and means Goddess or Protector of the Young. So in all probability, the Legislators of 1822, when they set aside the township from the town of Friendship, by accident, stumbled upon the word and appropriated the name, the significance of which is pleasant to think of."
Simeon DeWitt, the surveyor general for New York State in the early 19th century, was an avid student of ancient Roman mythology and is credited with suggesting the name.

Though it may seem that the town was named after the island of Cuba, this is not the case. A common reason for this perception is the prevalence of other towns in the area with names of Spanish cities or towns, such as Salamanca, Panama, and Bolivar.

Demographics

As of the census of 2000, there were 3,392 people, 1,336 households, and 915 families residing in the town.  The population density was 96.6 people per square mile (37.3/km2).  There were 1,710 housing units at an average density of 48.7 per square mile (18.8/km2).  The racial makeup of the town was 97.91% White, 0.27% Black or African American, 0.24% Native American, 0.38% Asian, 0.27% from other races, and 0.94% from two or more races. Hispanic or Latino of any race were 1.09% of the population.

There were 1,336 households, out of which 31.7% had children under the age of 18 living with them, 53.4% were married couples living together, 9.8% had a female householder with no husband present, and 31.5% were non-families. 25.1% of all households were made up of individuals, and 11.8% had someone living alone who was 65 years of age or older.  The average household size was 2.49 and the average family size was 2.98.

In the town, the population was spread out, with 25.7% under the age of 18, 7.7% from 18 to 24, 25.3% from 25 to 44, 24.7% from 45 to 64, and 16.6% who were 65 years of age or older.  The median age was 40 years. For every 100 females, there were 92.7 males.  For every 100 females age 18 and over, there were 87.4 males.

The median income for a household in the town was $33,939, and the median income for a family was $37,969. Males had a median income of $29,291 versus $21,115 for females. The per capita income for the town was $17,247.  About 6.0% of families and 9.4% of the population were below the poverty line, including 8.6% of those under age 18 and 6.3% of those age 65 or over.

History
The Town of Cuba was formed in 1822 from part of the town of Friendship.  In 1830, Cuba was reduced by the formation of the town of Genesee.  In 1835, Cuba was partitioned again to form the town of Clarksville.

Formerly known as Township 3 Range 2 of the Holland Land Purchase, the settlement of Cuba began in 1817, and the town was separated in 1822, and a village incorporated in 1850. Between 1810 and the late 1820s the place saw a boom in both settlement and population as many of the town's first businesses, churches and schools were established.

Business

Cheese
Starting in the 1870s, Cuba was a notable cheese producing town in New York. Part of the reason for why Cuba was so important in the cheese trade was its location on railroads making access from New York City easy. In the early 20th century, Cuba was known as the "Cheese Capital of the World".

Points of interest

Cuba Lake

It is the highest reservoir in Allegany County and the sixth-highest in western New York State. It was constructed in 1858 at a cost of $150,000, as a reservoir to feed the Genesee Valley Canal. At the time of its construction, Cuba Lake was the largest man-made lake in the world. The lake contains many game fish including bass, walleye, and northern pike.

Today, the lake mainly serves as a source of recreation for locals. It is surrounded by over 300 homes, many of which are year-round dwellings.

The Seneca Oil Spring
The Seneca Oil Spring is located near the spillway end of Cuba Lake on the Oil Springs Reservation in Allegany County. This is the site of a famed spring described by the Franciscan Missionary Joseph de La Roche Daillon in 1627, the first recorded mention of oil on the North American Continent. In 1927, the New York State Oil Producers Association sponsored the dedication of a monument at the site describing the history of the oil industry in North America. The site is now under the supervision of Allegany County and a picnic area is available for those visiting there.

McKinney Stables

Cuba is also home to the McKinney Stables of Empire City Farms, which the locals call the Block Barn, on Route 305 south of the Historic District. It was built to house William Simpson's "McKinney" horses. It has been a popular stable and the Czar of Russia sent a mare there to be mated with "Mckinney". It was once considered by the Anheuser Busch company as a spot to house its famous Clydesdales. Each year in September it hosts the Cuba Garlic Festival.

The stables were listed on the National Register of Historic Places in 1999.

Education

Local schools 
The main high school in Cuba is Cuba-Rushford Middle High School, which formed after a merger of the Cuba and Rushford school districts.  The Middle High School sits north of the town on Route 305 and teaches grades 6-12. What is known as the "Old" High School on Elm Street now teaches grades K-5; the "Old" Elementary School across the street is now the Elm Street Academy, part of a BOCES program. The mascot of Cuba was the Greyhounds until the merger in the mid-1990s when the mascot was renamed to the Rebels.  The Rebel's mascot resembles Yosemite Sam, with slight variations in the character design in order to avoid copyright issues.

Higher education 
West of Cuba, between the village of Allegany and the city of Olean, is St. Bonaventure University (SBU); SBU's campus is located on the Olean/Allegany border. Some of SBU's teams, such as the basketball and baseball teams, play in the Atlantic 10 Conference of NCAA Division 1.

Several of the State University of New York campuses are near Cuba. Olean is home to a Jamestown Community College satellite campus.

Churches
Cuba First Baptist Church
Christ Church (Episcopal)
Cuba United Methodist Church
Our Lady of Angels (Catholic)
North Park Wesleyan Church
The Church Project

Cemeteries
Code numbers refer to the Allegany County Cemetery Index card file at the Allegany County.
Cemetery - code 15-1; (Town 3, Range 2HC, lot 45), Cuba Village
Cemetery - code 15-2; (lot 54), Witter Road
Cemetery - code 15-3; (lot 45), Cuba Village
Catholic Cemetery - code 15-4; (lot 45), Cuba Village
North Cuba Cemetery - code 15-5; (lot 47), near Cuba Dam
Cemetery - code 15-6; near Cuba Lake

Notable people
Charles Ingalls, father of Laura Ingalls Wilder, the author of the popular Little House on the Prairie, was born on a farm in the North Cuba area. Several members of the Ingalls family had settled there prior to 1835, and several brothers all had adjoining farmlands. 
General Calvin T. Chamberlain was a brigadier general of the New York State Militia. In 1835, he opened a public house and general store, and was appointed Postmaster of Cuba. He was a member of the New York State Assembly (Allegany Co.) in 1836 and 1837. He was a member of the New York State Senate (6th D.) from 1843 to 1846, sitting in the 66th, 67th, 68th and 69th New York State Legislatures. 
Charles Edwin "Charley" Ackerly, born in Cuba, Olympic gold medal for wrestling, 1920 Summer Olympics in Antwerp, Belgium.
William Orton, President of Western Union.
Edward B. Vreeland, born in Cuba, politician and U.S. Representative.
James Pond, prominent abolitionist and a Medal of Honor winner for service during the American Civil War.
Joseph Hupp, chemist

References

External links

 Official website of the Village and Town of Cuba
 Town of Cuba webpage

1822 establishments in New York (state)
Towns in Allegany County, New York
Populated places established in 1822